Mike Conroy may refer to:

Mike Conroy (footballer, born 1957), Scottish former professional footballer who played for, amongst other clubs, Celtic
Mike Conroy (footballer, born 1965), Scottish former professional footballer who played for, amongst other clubs, Clydebank
Mike Conroy (ice hockey) (born 1950), Canadian former professional ice hockey player
Mike Conroy (writer), English comics historian